The Association for Promoting the Economy of Macau (Associação Promotora para a Economia de Macau) is a political party in the Macau Special Administrative Region of the People's Republic of China. Macau is an entity in which political parties don't play a role. Though some civic groups put forward lists at the elections.

See also
 Politics of Macau

Political parties in Macau